Ooni Okanlajosin was the 16th Ooni of Ife, a paramount traditional ruler of Ile Ife, the ancestral home of the Yorubas. He succeeded Ooni Gboonijio and was succeeded by  
Ooni Adegbalu.

References

Oonis of Ife
Yoruba history